We Are Strong may refer to:
We Are Strong (Saxon song), a song by heavy metal band Saxon (band)
We Are Strong, a song by American rapper Lil Bibby featuring Kevin Gates from the album Free Crack 2